Crescenzo Alatri was an Italian writer; born at Rome, 1825; died February 12, 1897. He was educated in the Talmud Torah of his native city, and graduated as rabbi, but never held any office. Alatri was the author of "History of the Jews in Rome", several extracts of which were published in the Educatore Israelita (1856), pp. 262 et seq. This work is still extant in manuscript. He is often mentioned as the Italian and French translator of Moses Hazan's Hebrew poems, and as one of the founders of the Società di Fratellanza, the aim of which was to educate poor Jewish children and to promote arts and handicrafts among the Jewish population.

References

1825 births
1897 deaths
Writers from Rome
Rabbis from Rome
19th-century Italian writers
19th-century male writers
19th-century Italian rabbis